Gerez is a surname. Notable people with the surname include:

Marisa Gerez (born 1976), Argentine footballer
Santiago Silva Gerez (born 1990), Uruguayan footballer
Veronica Marcela Gerez, Argentine road cyclist

See also
Pérez